Mittens was a chess engine developed by Chess.com. It was released on January 1, 2023, alongside four other engines, all of them given cat names. The engine became a viral sensation in the chess community due to exposure through content made by chess streamers and a social media marketing campaign. It was removed from the website on February 1, as expected through Chess.com's monthly bot cycles.

Release 
Mittens was released on January 1, 2023, as part of a New Year's event on Chess.com. It was one of five engines released, all with names based on cats. The other engines released were Scaredy Cat, rated 800; Angry Cat, rated 1000; Mr. Grumpers rated 1200 and Catspurrov (a pun on Garry Kasparov) rated 1400.

Design 
Mittens was conceptualized by Will Whalen, a college student at Hamilton College in Clinton, New York. Appearing as a cat, the engine trash talks the other player with a selection of voice lines: these lines include quotes from Robert Oppenheimer, Vincent van Gogh and Friedrich Nietzsche. The engine's "personality" was devised by a team headed by writer Sean Becker. 

In terms of software, Chess.com has not disclosed any information about the software running the engine. It may be based on Komodo Dragon 3. Mittens' strategy is to slowly grind down an opponent, a tactic likened to the playing style of Anatoly Karpov. Becker stated that the design team believed it would be "way more demoralizing and funny" for the engine to play this way. According to Grandmaster Hikaru Nakamura, Mittens sometimes misses the best move (or winning positions) in some situations.

Rating 
On Chess.com, Mittens had a rating of one. However, the engine's playing style and tactics evidence that it is much stronger than that; Mittens is able to beat or draw against many top human players. Estimates of Mittens' true rating range from an Elo of 3200 to 3500, because of its ability to beat bots of around that level. An upper bound of the engine's rating was found after IM Levy Rozman (known online as GothamChess) made Mittens play against Stockfish 15, a 3700 rated engine. Mittens lost the two games that the engines played.

Games 
Against human players, Mittens won over 99 percent of the multiple millions of games it played. Skilled chess players such as Hikaru Nakamura, Benjamin Bok, Levy Rozman and Eric Rosen have struggled against Mittens. While Rozman and Rosen both lost against the engine, Nakamura and Bok were both able to make a draw. In particular, Nakamura's game against the engine lasted 161 moves; he was playing as white. Rozman later went on to win against Mittens with engine assistance. World Champion Magnus Carlsen has publicly refused to play the engine, calling it a "transparent marketing trick" and "a soulless computer".

Against other engines, Mittens participated in Chess.com's Computer Chess Championships as a side act. Mittens played 150 games against an engine named after the film M3GAN and won overall with a score of 81.5 to 68.5.

Legacy 
Mittens went viral in the chess community due to its concept and design, helped by the social media exposure created by Chess.com. This included creating an official Twitter account to promote the engine. Chess streamers like Rozman and Nakamura helped cultivate this through creating content around the engine. A video by Nakamura entitled Mittens the chess bot will make you quit chess gained over 3.5 million views on YouTube.

On January 11, Chess.com reported issues with database scaling due to record levels of traffic: 40 percent more games had been played on Chess.com in January 2023 than any other month since the website's release. According to the Wall Street Journal, the popularity spike was more than the similar surge following the release of The Queen's Gambit. The popularity of Mittens was cited by Chess.com as a reason for this instability. The problems continued throughout January; Chess.com stated that they would have to upgrade their servers and invest more in cloud computing to solve the problems caused by the website's popularity surge.

In February 2023, Mittens and the other cat engines were removed from the computer section of Chess.com. They were replaced with five new engines themed around artificial intelligence. A message was posted on the Mittens Twitter account announcing the engines removal, reading "This is just the beginning. Goodbye for now."

References 

Chess engines
Computer-related introductions in 2023